The tomb of Hecatomnus or Hekatomnos (Greek: Ἑκατόμνος, Carian: 𐊴𐊭𐊪𐊵𐊫 k̂tmno “under-son, descendant(?). ”)  is in the Hisarbaşı District of Milas, one of the most important cities of the Caria region, located in the southwest of Anatolia. The tomb was added to the World Heritage Tentative List by UNESCO in 2012.

Biography of Hecatomnus 
Hecatomnus was the local ruler of  the Ancient City of Mylasa, which is called Milas in modern days, in region of Caria. Persian King Artaxerxes raised Hecatomnus  for becoming the Satrap (provincial governor) over part of the Persian empire. Together with Autophradates, who was the Satrap of Lydia, he was then to go against the rebel leader Euagoras, who would like to spread his control in all Island of Cyprus, but they lost the naval battle. Hekatomnos became by Artaxerxes (king of Persia) the ruler over Miletos, which is the one of the largest settlement characterised by Greek culture in Asia Minor. He was very impressed by Greek culture and he sent his youngest son to Athens. However, he always kept the Carian culture in his region. Furthermore, he used on coins images of the Carian chief Zeus Labraundos, whose sanctuary was in Labraunda in region of Caria.

Mousolus, who was the eldest son of Hecatomnus, became the new satrap of Caria, after Hecatomnus died.

Features of the tomb 
Hecatomnus' Tomb  consists of temenos Wall, honor Column, Podium and Tomb. The  Tomb is unique because it has the same concept as the Mausoleum at Halicarnassus, which is one of the seven wonders of the ancient world but earlier period than it. 

Hecatomnus' Tomb is the one of the most important monument of antique culture and representative the cult of the dead. It stands at a high level of architectural design, sculpture, and mural painting of the Tomb has a special place in art. Especially the "Friese of Hecatomnus' Tomb" with its size and quality, it is the only example in classic and hellenistic Anatolia.

Looting of the tomb 
In 2010, Turkish authorities had witnessed a police operation in which several treasure hunters were arrested while trying to steal the historical treasures from the tomb. After the arrests, it turned out that the illegal treasure hunters used high-tech drilling machines to drill a hole at least 40-50 cm thick into the marble wall of the tomb. They also used 245 tons of water during the process to cool the machine and let the waste water fill the monumental burial chamber.

After the robbery, an important study was launched to stop this destruction. Italian, Turkish and Japanese scientists continue to work on the restoration, climate control and documentation of the funerary monument. These works are crucial for the preservation of the remaining cultural assets and for the identification of the kidnapped artifacts. Intelligence units have discovered that the crown of Hekatomnos is in Scotland. In 2018, a golden crown stolen from the tomb was identified and agreed to be returned to Turkey

References 

Archaeology of the Achaemenid Empire
Achaemenid Anatolia
Hecatomnid dynasty
Milas
Burial sites of Middle Eastern royal families
Caria